Three Crowns refers to the three crowns of Sweden.

Three crowns may also refer to:
 College of the Three Crowns, a secondary school in Cologne, Germany
 Dunville's Three Crowns, a brand of Irish whiskey
 The Three Crowns, an Italian fairy tale written in 1634 by Giambattista Basile
 The Three Crowns, a pub in Askett, Buckinghamshire, England
 Three Crowns Books, an imprint of Oxford University Press for colonial writing
 The Three Crowns Hotel in Devon, England
 Three Crowns of the Sailor (1983), French fabulist film
 Trzy Korony, the summit of the Three Crowns Massif in Poland
 Union of the Crowns of England, Scotland, and Ireland

See also
 Three Kingdoms (disambiguation)
 Tre kronor (disambiguation)
 Triple Crown (disambiguation)